East Penn School District is a large public school district in Lehigh County, Pennsylvania in the Lehigh Valley region of eastern Pennsylvania. Established in 1952, it was initially known as the East Penn Union School District. 

East Penn School District serves students from Emmaus, five surrounding boroughs and townships of Alburtis, Lower Macungie, Macungie, Upper Milford, and Wescosville, eight surrounding unincorporated villages of East Texas, Hensingersville, Old Zionsville, Powder Valley, Shimerville, Sigmund, Vera Cruz, and Zionsville, and the census-designated place of Ancient Oaks, all located in the Lehigh Valley, the third most populated metropolitan region of Pennsylvania.

The district operates Emmaus High School in Emmaus for grades nine through 12, two public middle schools (Eyer Middle School and Lower Macungie Middle School, both located in Macungie) for grades six through eight, seven public elementary schools (located in Alburtis, Emmaus, Macungie, and Wescosville) for kindergarten through fifth grade, and one public elementary charter school (Seven Generations Charter School, located in Emmaus).

As of the 2021–22 school year, the school district had a total student enrollment of 7,993 students between all eleven of its schools, according to National Center for Education Statistics data. The district employs 565 professional and 505 support members with 90% of teachers holding a master's degree or higher.

Academics
East Penn School District is noted for its academic excellence as measured by post-graduate collegiate admissions. As of 2011, 55% of Emmaus High School graduates attended four-year colleges or universities, 24% attended two-year colleges and 3% entered business, nursing or technical schools, for a total of 82% pursuing higher education following high school graduation.

East Penn School District has one of the most developed advanced placement programs in the Lehigh Valley, offering 19 advanced placement courses and 23 honors courses. Emmaus High School has won more Scholastic Scrimmage championships than any Lehigh Valley high school in the history of this popular televised academic quiz show.

Athletics
Emmaus High School competes athletically in the Eastern Pennsylvania Conference, which has produced numerous professional and Olympic athletes, including players who have gone on to NFL and NBA careers. The school fields teams in all Eastern Pennsylvania Conference sports. 

Emmaus High School, founded in 1955, has won Eastern Pennsylvania Conference (or its predecessor, the Lehigh Valley Conference) championships at least once in each of the conference's sports. Emmaus High School holds the Eastern Pennsylvania Conference record for the most Pennsylvania state championships in all sports (13 since 2002) and is second in overall Eastern Pennsylvania Conference championships, behind Parkland High School.

Schools

High school
Emmaus High School (Emmaus)

Middle schools
Eyer Middle School (Macungie)
Lower Macungie Middle School (Macungie)

Elementary schools
Alburtis Elementary School (Alburtis) 
Jefferson Elementary School (Emmaus)
Lincoln Elementary School (Emmaus) 
Macungie Elementary School (Macungie) 
Shoemaker Elementary School (Macungie) 
Wescosville Elementary School (Wescosville) 
Willow Lane Elementary School (Macungie)

Elementary charter school
Seven Generations Charter School (Emmaus)

Notable alumni 
Charles Bierbauer, former CNN correspondent
Howard J. Buss, composer and music publisher
Keith Dorney, former professional football player, Detroit Lions
Aaron Gray, former professional basketball player, Chicago Bulls, New Orleans Hornets, Sacramento Kings and Toronto Raptors
Todd Howard, game director, Fallout 3, Oblivion, Skyrim
Michael Johns, health care executive and former White House presidential speechwriter
Marty Nothstein, 2000 Olympic Games gold medal winner, track cycling
Nicole Reinhart, two-time Pan American Games gold-medal winner, track cycling
Cindy Werley, 1996 Olympian, U.S. field hockey team
Kyzir White, professional football player, Arizona Cardinals

References

External links 
East Penn School District official website
East Penn School District on Facebook
East Penn School District on Twitter
East Penn School District profile at Niche

 
1952 establishments in Pennsylvania
School districts established in 1952
School districts in Lehigh County, Pennsylvania